Dimitar Petkov (born 24 August 1987) is a Bulgarian footballer who plays as a defensive midfielder for Dacia Unirea Brăila.

References

External links
 

1987 births
Living people
Sportspeople from Blagoevgrad
Bulgarian footballers
PFC Minyor Pernik players
PFC Slavia Sofia players
PFC CSKA Sofia players
Botev Plovdiv players
PFC Lokomotiv Mezdra players
PFC Cherno More Varna players
FC Montana players
FC Zestafoni players
Aris Limassol FC players
FC Tiraspol players
PFC Marek Dupnitsa players
FC Septemvri Simitli players
FC Botev Vratsa players
FC Tsarsko Selo Sofia players
OFC Vihren Sandanski players
First Professional Football League (Bulgaria) players
Second Professional Football League (Bulgaria) players
Erovnuli Liga players
Cypriot First Division players
Cypriot Second Division players
Moldovan Super Liga players
Bulgarian expatriate footballers
Expatriate footballers in Georgia (country)
Expatriate footballers in Cyprus
Expatriate footballers in Moldova
Bulgarian expatriate sportspeople in Georgia (country)
Bulgarian expatriate sportspeople in Cyprus
Bulgarian expatriate sportspeople in Moldova
Association football midfielders